The Gentleman from Maxim's is a 1933 German comedy film directed by Carl Boese and starring Lee Parry, Johannes Riemann and Oskar Karlweis.
It was shot at the Johannisthal Studios in Berlin. The film's sets were designed by the art director Gustav A. Knauer and Walter Reimann.

Synopsis
A lawyer falls in love with a pretty soubrette, but is concerned when his charming friend comes to visit and tries to pair him off with another woman to prevent the competition.

Cast
Lee Parry as Ursula Heider
Johannes Riemann as Hans Volkmann
Oskar Karlweis as Werner Radke
Leo Slezak as Rübsam - chamber singer
Manny Ziener as Laura Pikardt
Jessie Vihrog as Mimi
Käthe Haack and Ernst Behmer as a married couple
Albert Florath

Kitty Meinhardt
Julius Brandt
Erich Fiedler
Kurt Werther
Ellen Blarr
Oscar Joost as Kapellmeister

References

Bibliography 
 Klaus, Ulrich J. Deutsche Tonfilme: Jahrgang 1933. Klaus-Archiv, 1988.

External links

1933 comedy films
1930s German-language films
German comedy films
Films of the Weimar Republic
Films directed by Carl Boese
German black-and-white films
1930s German films
Films shot at Johannisthal Studios